Jiului is a metro station in the Pajura district of northern Bucharest, Romania, serving Bucharest Metro's M4 Line. The station was opened on 1 July 2011 as part of the extension from 1 Mai to Parc Bazilescu.

The station is named after a nearby street. Before the opening, the name was changed from the proposed Pajura because the latter was deemed more suitable for a future M6 station located in the same district, but more centrally.

References

Bucharest Metro stations
Railway stations opened in 2011
2011 establishments in Romania